Kevin Edwards (born 12 December 1980, in Sangre Grande) is a male beach volleyball player from Trinidad and Tobago.

Kevin made history along with David Thomas, becoming the first caribbean team playing in the Swatch FIVB World Tour, the Montreal Open.

Playing with the same partner, he earned the 10th place at the Central American and Caribbean Games beach volleyball tournament.

References

 
 

1980 births
Living people
Trinidad and Tobago beach volleyball players
Men's beach volleyball players
Competitors at the 2006 Central American and Caribbean Games